Schistissa is a monotypic moth genus in the family Eupterotidae. Its single species, Schistissa uniformis, is found in South Africa. Both the genus and species were described by Per Olof Christopher Aurivillius in 1901.

References

Endemic moths of South Africa
Moths described in 1901
Eupterotinae